Wyoming City (also known as Mohawk, Vedra, and Wyoming) is an unincorporated community in McDowell County, West Virginia, United States.

Wyoming City is on the Norfolk Southern Railway (former Norfolk and Western) network and the Tug Fork river.

References

Unincorporated communities in McDowell County, West Virginia
Unincorporated communities in West Virginia